Ludwig Männer (11 July 1912 – 13 January 2003) was a German international footballer.

References

1912 births
2003 deaths
Association football midfielders
German footballers
Germany international footballers
Hannover 96 players